Fay F. Wood was a college football player and coach. A native of Syracuse, he played for the Notre Dame Fighting Irish as an end from 1907 to 1909, catching the first touchdown pass in the history of Notre Dame football. He was later the line coach under John Heisman and later William Alexander at Georgia Tech.

References

American football ends
Georgia Tech Yellow Jackets football coaches
Players of American football from New York (state)
Notre Dame Fighting Irish football players
Notre Dame Fighting Irish men's basketball players
American men's basketball players